Peter Levy is an Australian cinematographer known for his collaborations with director Stephen Hopkins on blockbuster action and thriller films like Predator 2, Blown Away, and Lost in Space. He has been a member of the Australian Cinematographers Society since 1983 and of the American Society of Cinematographers since 2000.

Filmography

Film

Television

Awards & nominations

Nominations
American Society of Cinematographers, Outstanding Achievement in Cinematography in Movies of the Week/Mini-Series'/Pilot for Basic or Pay TV for The Life and Death of Peter Sellers (2005)
American Society of Cinematographers, 2002, Outstanding Achievement in Cinematography in Movies of the Week/Mini-Series'/Pilot for Network or Basic Broadcast TV for the pilot of 24 (2002)

Wins
Australian Cinematographers Society - Cinematographer of the Year for Predator 2 (1991)
Primetime Emmy Award for Outstanding Cinematography for a Half-Hour Series for pilot of Californication (2008)
Primetime Emmy Award for Outstanding Cinematography for a Miniseries or Movie for The Life and Death of Peter Sellers (2005)

References

External links

People from Sydney
Australian cinematographers
Living people
Year of birth missing (living people)